Terellia is a subgenus of tephritid or fruit flies in the family Tephritidae.

Species
Terellia colon (Meigen, 1826) 
Terellia fuscicornis (Loew, 1844)
Terellia longicauda (Meigen, 1838)
Terellia luteola (Wiedemann, 1830)
Terellia odontolophi Korneyev, 1993
Terellia orheana Korneyev, 1990
Terellia pseudovirens (Hering, 1940)
Terellia ruficauda (Fabricius, 1794)
Terellia sabroskyi Freidberg, 1982
Terellia serratulae (Linnaeus, 1758)
Terellia uncinata White, 1989
Terellia vectensis (Collin, 1937)
Terellia virens (Loew, 1846) - Green Knapweed Clearwing Fly 
Terellia winthemi (Meigen, 1826)
Terellia zerovae Korneyev, 1985

References

Tephritinae
Insect subgenera